Bandar Sarikei National Secondary School is a public secondary school in Sarikei, Sarawak, Malaysia. In 2009, the school has 1,322 students, of which 652 are male and 670 female, as well as 106 teachers.

History
The school was initially known as Sarikei Town Government Secondary School. It was established on a  land which was leased from the then Methodist Secondary School. The first principal was Wong Kwong Soon.

In 1979, the school moved into the permanent grounds and in 1982 it was inaugurated by the then Malaysian Prime Minister, Mahathir Mohamad.

On 3 December 1985, the school's Parent-Teacher Association was established.

Achievement 
In 1993, the school achieved 100% passing rate in Sijil Pelajaran Malaysia (Malaysian Certificate of Education), the national secondary school examination. Meanwhile, in 1996 it achieved 100% passing rate in Sijil Tinggi Pelajaran Malaysia (Malaysian Higher School Certificate), the national sixth form (pre-university) examination.

References 

Sarikei District
National secondary schools in Malaysia
Secondary schools in Sarawak